Bishard "Budda" Baker (born January 10, 1996) is an American football safety for the Arizona Cardinals of the National Football League (NFL). He played college football at Washington, and was selected by the Cardinals in the second round of the 2017 NFL Draft.

Early years
Baker attended Bellevue High School in Bellevue, Washington. He played safety and running back in football, and also ran track. As a senior, he was named the Seattle Times High School Athlete of the Year. Baker was rated as a four-star recruit and was ranked among the top safeties in his class. He originally committed to the University of Oregon to play college football, but flipped to the University of Washington the night before National Signing Day.

College career
As a true freshman at Washington in 2014, Baker started all 14 games, recording 80 tackles, one interception, and one sack. Following his freshman campaign, Baker was named a Freshman All-American by USA Today. As a sophomore in 2015 he started 12 of 13 games and was named All-Pac-12 after recording 49 tackles and two interceptions. Baker was named a pre-season All-American prior to the 2016 season. Following the 2016 season, Baker earned consensus all-American honors as a result of being named a first-team all-American by The Sporting News and the Football Writers Association of America, and a second-team all-American by the American Football Coaches Association and The Associated Press. On January 3, 2017, Baker announced his decision to forgo his senior season and enter the 2017 NFL Draft.

Collegiate statistics

Professional career
Baker attended the NFL Combine and completed all of the combine and positional drills. He participated at Washington's Pro Day and only ran positional drills for over 50 NFL team representatives and scouts. The majority of NFL draft experts and analysts projected Baker to be a second round pick. Teams were impressed by his performance but were concerned his lack of size could affect his ability to play in the NFL. He was ranked the top nickelback available in the draft by NFL analyst Mike Mayock, was ranked the second best free safety prospect by NFLDraftScout.com, and the fourth best safety in the draft by Sports Illustrated and ESPN.

2017
The Arizona Cardinals selected Baker in the second round (36th overall) of the 2017 NFL Draft. The Arizona Cardinals traded their second round (45th overall), fourth round (119th overall), and seventh round (197th overall) picks in the 2017 NFL Draft to the Chicago Bears in order to move up in the second round and draft Baker with the 36th overall pick. The Cardinals also received a seventh round pick (221st overall) from the Chicago Bears. He was the fourth safety selected in 2017 and one of three Washington defensive backs selected, along with Kevin King and Sidney Jones.

On May 25, the Arizona Cardinals signed Baker to a four-year, $6.83 million contract with $3.88 million guaranteed and a signing bonus of $3.10 million.

Due to NFL's rules for colleges who follow quarters systems, Baker was unable to attend OTA's or minicamp until the University of Washington's graduation day. He impressed coaches throughout training camp and was named the backup free safety to Tyrann Mathieu to begin the regular season.

He made his professional regular season debut in the Arizona Cardinals’ season-opener at the Detroit Lions and made one tackle in their 35–23 loss. On November 19, 2017, Baker earned his first career start after Tyvon Branch suffered a torn ACL the previous week. In his first career start, he collected a season-high 13 combined tackles (11 solo), deflected two passes, and made his first career sack during a 31–21 loss at the Houston Texans in Week 11.
On December 19, 2017, Baker was one of four Cardinals named to the 2018 Pro Bowl as a special teamer. In Week 16, he tied his season-high of 13 combined tackles (eight solo) and broke up a pass in the Cardinals’ 23–0 victory against the New York Giants. He finished his rookie season in 2017 with 74 combined tackles (58 solo) and seven pass deflections in 16 games and seven starts.

2018
On January 1, 2018, head coach Bruce Arians announced his retirement. On January 22, 2018, the Arizona Cardinals announced their decision to hire Carolina Panthers’ defensive coordinator Steve Wilks as their new head coach. Throughout training camp, Baker competed to be the starting strong safety against Tre Boston. Head coach Steve Wilks named Baker the starting strong safety to begin the regular season, alongside free safety Antoine Bethea. He was also named the first-team nickel back with Tre Boston taking over at strong safety in packages that require five defensive backs. In Week 5, Baker collected a season-high 16 combined tackles (11 solo), deflected a pass, and made a sack during a 28–18 win at the San Francisco 49ers. In Week 6, against the Minnesota Vikings, Baker recorded a 36-yard fumble return for a touchdown in the 27–17 loss. He finished the season second on the team with 102 tackles through 14 games and 13 starts.

2019
In week 2 against the Baltimore Ravens, Baker recorded a team high 11 tackles as the Cardinals lost 23–17.
In week 9 against the San Francisco 49ers, Baker recorded a team high 13 tackles and 3 passes defended in the 28–25 loss.
In week 10 against the Tampa Bay Buccaneers, Baker recorded a team high 9 tackles and forced a fumble on running back Ronald Jones II which he recovered in the 30–27 loss.

2020
On August 25, 2020, Baker signed a four-year, $59 million extension with the Cardinals, making him the highest-paid safety in NFL history at the time.
In Week 1 against the San Francisco 49ers, Baker recorded a team high 15 tackles (10 solo) during the 24–20 win.
In Week 5 against the New York Jets, Baker recorded his first sack of the season on Joe Flacco during the 30–10 win.
On Monday Night Football in Week 6 against the Dallas Cowboys, Baker forced a fumble on running back Ezekiel Elliott that was recovered by the Cardinals, sacked quarterback Andy Dalton once, and recorded his first career interception off a pass thrown by Dalton during the 38–10 win.
Baker was named the NFC Defensive Player of the Week for his performance in Week 6. 
In Week 7 against the Seattle Seahawks on Sunday Night Football, Baker recorded a team high 14 tackles and intercepted a pass thrown by Russell Wilson although he was tackled by DK Metcalf before he get in the endzone during the 37–34 overtime win.
Baker was named the NFC Defensive Player of the Month for October after tallying 31 tackles, two sacks, two interceptions, and a forced fumble.

2021
With the NFL's new jersey number rules, Baker changed his number from 32 to 3 before the 2021 season. He started all 17 games, recording 98 tackles, two sacks, seven passes defensed, and three interceptions.

2022
On December 28, 2022, Baker was placed on injured reserve.

NFL career statistics

Personal life

Baker's mother started calling him Budda as a baby since she thought he looked like a Buddha doll.

References

External links
 
 Arizona Cardinals bio
 Washington Huskies bio
 

1996 births
Living people
American football safeties
Arizona Cardinals players
Players of American football from Washington (state)
Sportspeople from Bellevue, Washington
Washington Huskies football players
National Conference Pro Bowl players
All-American college football players